NGC 4995 is a "moderately bright and large galaxy" in the constellation Virgo. It is a member of the NGC 4995 Group of galaxies, which is a member of the Virgo II Groups, a series of galaxies and galaxy clusters strung out from the southern edge of the Virgo Supercluster.

References

Virgo (constellation)
4995